The Pajalat,  also Cajalate, Pajalac, Pajalache, Pajalatam, Pallalat or Paxolot were a Native American group who lived in the area just south of San Antonio, Texas prior to the coming of the Spanish to the region in the 18th century.  The Pajalat spoke a form of the Coahuilteco language.

Starting in 1731 the Pajalat moved to Mission Concepcion, where members of the tribe shared alternated holding office as gobernador and alcalde with Tacames.

Sources
Barr, Juliana. Peace Came in the Form of a Woman: Indians and Spaniards in the Texas Borderlands. Chapel Hill: University of North Carolina Press, 2007. especially page 128.
Thomas N. Campbell, "PAJALAT INDIANS," Handbook of Texas Online (https://tshaonline.org/handbook/online/articles/bmp15), accessed December 12, 2011. Published by the Texas State Historical Association.

Native American tribes in Texas